Tasajera may refer to:

 HMS Tasajera (F125)
 Tasajera explosion
 Calisto tasajera

See also 

 Tassajara, California